Campylocentrum pachyrrhizum is a species of orchid. It is native to the West Indies (Greater Antilles plus Trinidad), southern Mexico (Chiapas, Oaxaca, Yucatán Peninsula), Central America (Guatemala and Panama), northern South America (Venezuela, Ecuador, Brazil, the Guianas), and southern Florida.

References

External links
IOSPE orchid photos, Campylocentrum pachyrrhizum (Rchb. f.) Rolfe 1908 Photo by © Von Gastam
Leighton Photography & Imaging, Ribbon Orchid (Campylocentrum pachyrrhizum) 

pachyrrhizum
Orchids of Mexico
Orchids of Central America
Orchids of South America
Flora of the Caribbean
Plants described in 1865
Flora without expected TNC conservation status